Roberval (Air Saguenay) Water Aerodrome, formerly , was located on Lac Saint-Jean, Quebec, Canada.

See also
 Roberval Airport

References

Roberval, Quebec
Registered aerodromes in Saguenay–Lac-Saint-Jean
Defunct seaplane bases in Quebec